For the town in India, see Ziro.

Ziro is a province of Burkina Faso, located in its Centre-Ouest Region. The provincial capital is the town of Sapouy.

Education
In 2011 the province had 0 primary schools and 0 secondary schools.

Healthcare
In 2011 the province had 17 health and social promotion centers (Centres de santé et de promotion sociale), 2 doctors and 47 nurses.

Demographics

Administrative divisions
Prior to 2004 Ziro was divided into three departments: Bougnounou, Cassou and Sapouy. After the 2004 reorganization Ziro was divided into six departments, listed with their administrative seat, and population as of 2006 census.

See also
 Regions of Burkina Faso
 Provinces of Burkina Faso
 Departments of Burkina Faso

Notes

 
Provinces of Burkina Faso